Srashen is a village in the Kapan Municipality of the Syunik Province in Armenia.

Etymology 
The village was previously known as Kilisakend.

Demographics 
The Statistical Committee of Armenia reported its population was 91 in 2010, down from 105 at the 2001 census.

Gallery

References 

Populated places in Syunik Province